

Events 
 Johann Hermann Schein becomes cantor of Thomasschule zu Leipzig
 Manuel Correia joins his father as a singer in the ducal capela at Vila Viçosa, Portugal.
 Librettist Andrea Salvadori becomes court poet to the Medici family.

Musical groups formed 
 A collegium musicum is founded in Prague.

Publications 
Gregor Aichinger – Triplex liturgiarum fasciculus e tribus ac diversis optimorum musicorum modulis concinnatus... (Augsburg: Johannes Praetorius)
Bartolomeo Barbarino – Canzonettas for one and two voices, with some for solo voice, either soprano or tenor, with theorbo or other instruments (Venice: Ricciardo Amadino)
Valerio Bona – Lamentations for Holy Week with the Benedictus and Miserere for each day, for two choirs with continuo, Op. 22 (Venice: Giacomo Vincenti)
Bernardino Borlasca –  (Jacob's Ladder) for eight voices and various instruments, Op. 6 (Venice: Giacomo Vincenti), a collection of sacred songs for all solemnities of the year
Sethus Calvisius –  (Swan song) for eight voices (Leipzig: Lorenz Kober), a setting of Psalm 90 verse 10, published posthumously
Ignazio Donati –  (Venice: Giacomo Vincenti)
Melchior Franck
 for four, five, six, seven, eight, and nine voices or instruments (Nuremberg: Georg Leopold Fuhrmann), a collection of motets
 for five voices (Coburg: Justus Hauck), a wedding motet
 for six voices (Coburg: Justus Hauck), a wedding motet
 for six voices (Coburg: Justus Hauck), a wedding motet
 for six voices (Coburg: Justus Hauck), a wedding motet
  (Coburg: Justus Hauck)
 for four voices (Nuremberg: Georg Leopold Fuhrmann), a collection of secular songs and dances
Joachim van den Hove –  for two voices or violins (Leiden: Godefridus Basson)
Sigismondo d'India
Fourth book of madrigals for five voices (Venice: Ricciardo Amadino)
Fifth book of madrigals for five voices (Venice: Ricciardo Amadino)
Scipione Lacorcia – Second book of madrigals for five voices (Naples: Giovanni Giacomo Carlino)
Luca Marenzio – Motets for five, six, and seven voices with organ bass (Venice: Ricciardo Amadino), published posthumously
Simone Molinaro –  (Loano: Francesco Castello)
Pietro Pace – Scherzi, arie, et madrigali a 1–4 v..., Op. 13 (Venice: Giacomo Vincenti)
Giuseppe Palazzotto e Tagliavia – First book of motets (Palermo: Giovanni Battista Maringo)
Claudio Pari – Third book of madrigals for five voices (Palermo: Giovanni Battista Maringo)
Peter Philips
 (Sacred Delights) for two and three voices with organ bass (Antwerp: Pierre Phalèse)
 (The Spiritual Nightengales), a collection of sacred songs for two voices with organ bass (Valenciennes: Jean Vervliet)
Hieronymus Praetorius – Liber Missarum (Hamburg: Henrico Carstens) 
Nicolas Vallet – Le Secret des Muses, book 2

Classical music   
Girolamo Frescobaldi – Peccavi super numerum, motet for 3 voices and basso continuo
Claudio Monteverdi – Tirsi e Clori (ballet)

Opera 
 Domenico Belli's' Orfeo dolente
 Claudio Monteverdi – Le nozze di Tetide (lost)

Births 
February 28 – Kaspar Förster, opera composer (d. 1673)
May 18 – Johann Jakob Froberger, composer and organist (died 1667)
September – Jacques de Saint-Luc,  lutenist and composer (died c.1710)
date unknown – Matthias Weckman, German composer (died 1674)
probable – Maurizio Cazzati, Italian composer (died 1678)

Deaths 
June 6 – Cornelis Schuyt, organist and composer (born 1557)
unknown date – Johann Steffens, German organist and composer (born c.1560)
probable
Krzysztof Klabon, composer, lutenist, and singer (born c.1550)
Giuliano Paratico, singer and chitarrone player (born c.1550)

References 

 
Music
17th century in music
Music by year